In enzymology, a sedoheptulokinase is an enzyme that catalyzes the chemical reaction

ATP + sedoheptulose  ADP + sedoheptulose 7-phosphate

Thus, the two substrates of this enzyme are ATP and sedoheptulose, whereas its two products are ADP and sedoheptulose 7-phosphate.

This enzyme belongs to the family of transferases, specifically those transferring phosphorus-containing groups (phosphotransferases) with an alcohol group as acceptor.  The systematic name of this enzyme class is ATP:sedoheptulose 7-phosphotransferase. Other names in common use include heptulokinase, and sedoheptulokinase (phosphorylating).  This enzyme participates in carbon fixation.

References

 

EC 2.7.1
Enzymes of unknown structure